Cosmopterix maritimella is a moth in the family Cosmopterigidae. It was described by Sinev in 1985. It is found in Russia.

References

Natural History Museum Lepidoptera generic names catalog

Moths described in 1985
maritimella